The Iranian Volleyball Super League 2016–17 was the 30th season of the Iranian Volleyball Super League, the highest professional volleyball league in Iran.

Regular season

Standings

Results

Playoffs
All times are Iran Standard Time (UTC+03:30).
All series were the best-of-three format.

Quarterfinals
Sarmayeh Bank Tehran vs. Shahrdari Tabriz

Saipa Tehran vs. Salehin Varamin

Paykan Tehran vs. Khatam Ardakan

Shahrdari Urmia vs. Kalleh Mazandaran

Semifinals
Sarmayeh Bank Tehran vs. Saipa Tehran

Paykan Tehran vs. Shahrdari Urmia

3rd place
Saipa Tehran vs. Shahrdari Urmia

Final
Sarmayeh Bank Tehran vs. Paykan Tehran

Final standings

References

External links
Iran Volleyball Federation

League 2016-17
Iran Super League, 2016-17
Iran Super League, 2016-17
Volleyball League, 2016-17
Volleyball League, 2016-17